The Gooding City of Rocks West Wilderness Study Area is a Bureau of Land Management wilderness study area that covers  in Gooding County, Idaho between the towns of Gooding and Fairfield. The Gooding City of Rocks West WSA is contiguous (but divided by dirt roads) with three other WSAs in the Bennett Hills: Black Canyon, Gooding City of Rocks East, and Little City of Rocks. Portions of the WSA's borders are formed by dirt roads, which also separates it from the Gooding City of Rocks West and Black Canyon WSAs.

Sagebrush and grasses are the dominant vegetation in the WSA, although willows, quaking aspen, cottonwoods, and other trees can be found in shaded sections of some canyons. Wildlife that can be found in the WSA include elk, mule deer, coyote, and various birds of prey and upland game. Catchall Creek and other streams flow through the WSA. All of the WSA was recommended to be included as part of the National Wilderness Preservation System because it provides exceptional wilderness values. However, the area will remain a WSA until it is released or designated a wilderness area. Petroglyphs and surface lithic scatters can be found in the WSA.|year=2009

References

Protected areas of Gooding County, Idaho
Protected areas established in 1992
Bureau of Land Management areas in Idaho
1992 establishments in the United States